Babylonia perforata is a species of sea snail, a marine gastropod mollusc in the family Babyloniidae. It has been named after Italian journalist Piero Angela.

Subspecies
 Babylonia perforata perforata (G.B. Sowerby II, 1870) : synonyms = Eburna perforata G.B. Sowerby II, 1870
 Babylonia perforata pieroangelai Cossigniani, 2008 : synonyms = Babylonia pieroangelai Cossignani, 2008

Description

Distribution

References

 Sowerby, G.B. Jr. (1870). Descriptions of Forty-eight new Species of Shells. Proc. Zool. Soc. Lond. (1870): 249–259
 Fraussen K. & Stratmann D. (2013) The family Babyloniidae. In: G.T. Poppe & K. Groh (eds), A conchological iconography. Harxheim: Conchbooks. 96 pp., pls 1–48
 Liu J.Y. [Ruiyu] (ed.). (2008). Checklist of marine biota of China seas. China Science Press. 1267 pp.

External links
 Taibnet.sinica: Babylonia perforata
 Altena C.O. van Regteren & Gittenberger E. (1981) The genus Babylonia (Prosobranchia: Buccinidae). Zoologische Verhandelingen 188: 1–57, + 11 pls

Babyloniidae
Gastropods described in 1870